Marlboro is a hamlet (and census-designated place) in Ulster County, New York, United States. The population was 3,669 at the 2020 census. Marlboro is in the southeastern part of the town of Marlborough, located in the southeastern corner of the county.

History 
The community was the site of the first settlement in the town, around 1697.  The Chapel Hill Bible Church, Christ Episcopal Church, Dubois-Sarles Octagon, Elliot–Buckley House, and Shady Brook Farm are listed on the National Register of Historic Places.  Marlboro is also the location of the Gomez Mill House, an historical site which is the oldest Jewish residence in Ulster County.  It was additionally the first paper mill in Ulster County.

Geography
Marlboro is located at  (41.604693, -73.974822).

The community is on the west bank of the Hudson River.

Demographics

As of the census of 2000, there were 2,339 people, 926 households, and 605 families residing in the CDP. The population density was 846.3 per square mile (327.2/km2). There were 981 housing units at an average density of 354.9/sq mi (137.2/km2). The racial makeup of the CDP was 95.68% White, 1.84% African American, 0.26% Native American, 0.34% Asian, 0.81% from other races, and 1.07% from two or more races. Hispanic or Latino of any race were 4.96% of the population.

There were 926 households, out of which 32.2% had children under the age of 18 living with them, 51.2% were married couples living together, 9.9% had a female householder with no husband present, and 34.6% were non-families. 28.2% of all households were made up of individuals, and 12.3% had someone living alone who was 65 years of age or older. The average household size was 2.53 and the average family size was 3.14.

In the CDP, the population was spread out, with 26.0% under the age of 18, 6.4% from 18 to 24, 31.1% from 25 to 44, 21.7% from 45 to 64, and 14.8% who were 65 years of age or older. The median age was 37 years. For every 100 females, there were 93.8 males. For every 100 females age 18 and over, there were 89.4 males.

The median income for a household in the CDP was $43,073, and the median income for a family was $52,688. Males had a median income of $37,788 versus $28,542 for females. The per capita income for the CDP was $20,123. About 10.9% of families and 12.0% of the population were below the poverty line, including 16.1% of those under age 18 and 12.0% of those age 65 or over.

Notable people
 Rob Bell - Former Major League Baseball player for the Cincinnati Reds, Texas Rangers and Tampa Bay Devil Rays
 Brian Benben - actor; star of Dream On on HBO.
 Dee Brown - Former Major League Baseball player for the Kansas City Royals
 Tom Cornell - journalist and peace activist.
 Wade Davis - Former Major League Baseball pitcher for the Tampa Bay Rays, Kansas City Royals, Chicago Cubs and Colorado Rockies
 John Esposito - Jazz pianist. Graduated from Marlboro High School June 1971. Teaches at Bard College.
 John M. Falcone - Police officer in Poughkeepsie, NY.  Killed in the line of duty in February 2011.
 Scott Lobdell - Comic book writer and screenwriter.
 Nicole Polizzi - person known as "Snooki" on MTV's reality television series Jersey Shore.

References

External links
 Marlboro Free Library Digital Collections

Census-designated places in New York (state)
Census-designated places in Ulster County, New York
Hamlets in New York (state)
Populated places established in 1697
Former villages in New York (state)
Hamlets in Ulster County, New York
New York (state) populated places on the Hudson River
1697 establishments in the Province of New York